Bandish (lit. "Restriction") is a 2019 Pakistani supernatural horror drama series co-produced by Fahad Mustafa, and Dr. Ali Kazmi under Big Bang Entertainment and directed by Aabis Raza. It features Marina Khan, Sajid Hassan, Hira, Mani, Zubab Rana and Zainab Ahmed in leads whilst Farah Shah played the main antagonist. It was first aired on 21 January 2019 on ARY Digital. It tells the story of a woman named Sumbul, who after being bullied in University and being rejected and made fun of by her crush Junaid, many years later, turns to black magic and sorcery to cast evil spells on Junaid and his family, which consists of a wife and three daughter. A second season has been commissioned.

Cast
Sajid Hasan as Junaid; Madiha's husband
Marina Khan as Madiha; Junaid's wife, Sania and Hania's mother
Hira Salman as Sania; Madiha and Junaid's elder daughter
Salman Saqib Sheikh as Dr.Abhiyaan; Sania's love interest
Zubab Rana as Hania; Madiha and Junaid's 2nd daughter, Sania's sister
Farah Shah as Sumbul; Tantric (Black magic specialist)
Zainab Ahmed as Sandal; Junaid's secretary, later married Junaid
Hoorain as Aleena (Child); Madiha and Junaid's younger daughter, Sania and Hania's sister
Fahad Shaikh as Hamza; Love interest of Hania
Khalid Zafar as Izhaan; Hamza's father, Religious scholar
Arsala Siddiqui as Hamza's sister, Izhaan's daughter
Birjees Farooqui as Hamza's mother

Reception
The drama was praised due to its unique storyline and thrilling performances by the whole cast. It was one of the most popular dramas of 2019 and was widely appreciated. A second season is in development.

Soundtrack

The title song is sung by & the music was composed by Abbas Ali Khan   and the lyrics were written by Ali Imran.

Sequel
This show was renewed for a sequel in May 2020 but was delayed due to Covid-19

In August 2022, the shooting began with Aamna Ilyas, Affan Waheed, Shuja Asad, Sania Saeed and Zainab Qayyum finalized for playing pivotal roles in the show.

In October 2022, the shooting ended and the post production work began which was completed by November End and this series would be launching in 2023.

References

External links 
 Official website

Pakistani drama television series
2019 Pakistani television series debuts
2019 Pakistani television series endings
Pakistani horror fiction television series
Urdu-language television shows
ARY Digital original programming